Magaziner is a surname which may refer to:

Surname
 (1902–1993), Austrian journalist
Ira Magaziner (born 1947), American advisor
Louis Magaziner (1878–1956), American architect
Seth Magaziner (born 1983), American politician

Surnames